The Edgar Allan Poe Award for Best Short Story, established in 1951, is an annual American literary award, presented alongside other Edgar Awards. 

The award is presented to stories between 1,000 and 22,000 words that have been published in a magazine, periodical, e-zine, or book-length anthology. Stories shorter than 1,000 words (i.e., mini- or flash fiction) or longer than 22,000 words are ineligible. Although the Edgar Awards do not have a flash fiction category, works considered too long for the Short Story Award may be eligible for the Edgar Allan Poe Award for Best Novel, Edgar Allan Poe Award for Best First Novel, or Edgar Allan Poe Award for Best Paperback Original.

The Edgar Allan Poe Award for Best Short Story winners are listed below.

Winners

1950s

1960s

1970s

1980s

1990s

20002

2010s

2020s

See also
 Edgar Award
 Mystery Writers of America
 :Category:Edgar Award winners
 :Category:Edgar Award winning works

External links
 The official website of Edgar Awards

Lists of writers by award
Mystery and detective fiction awards
Short story awards
English-language literary awards

Awards established in 1951